In Mandaean cosmology, a maṭarta (plural form: maṭarata) is a "station" or "toll house" that is located between the World of Light (alma ḏ-nhūra) from Tibil (Earth). It has variously been translated as "watch-station", "toll-station", "way-station", or "purgatory". Maṭartas are guarded by various uthras (celestial beings from the World of Light) and demons. Ruha, the queen of the underworld, is the ruler or guardian of the third maṭarta.

To reach the World of Light (alma ḏ-nhūra) from Tibil (Earth), souls must pass through the various maṭartas that are situated in between. Rituals such as the masiqta can help guide souls past the various maṭarta so that they could reach the World of Light.

In the Ginza Rabba
In the Ginza Rabba, Chapter 3 in Book 5 of the Right Ginza, Book 6 of the Right Ginza (also known as the "Book of Dinanukht"), and Chapter 4 in Book 1 of the Left Ginza give detailed descriptions of the maṭartas.

Some of the matarta guards are:
Nbaz (Nbaz Haila)
Nbu (Mercury)
Zan-Haza-Zban
Yur (Yur-Yahur)
Arhum
Pilpin-Pipin
Jesus the Messiah ( / )
Ruha
Himun
Ptahil
Abatur

Parallels in other religions

In the Nag Hammadi library, the Coptic Apocalypse of Paul describes an ascent through the seven lower heavens, which are guarded by various angels inflicting punishments on sinners. Heavenly "toll collectors" are mentioned in the First Apocalypse of James (33,2-27), as well as angels torturing the soul in the Book of Thomas (141,36-39) and Pistis Sophia.

Matartas in Mandaeism are also similar to aerial toll houses in Eastern Orthodox Christianity.

The Second Book of Enoch, a Jewish apocryphal text written in the first century CE, describes the mystical ascent of the patriarch Enoch through a hierarchy of Ten Heavens. Enoch passes through the Garden of Eden in the Third Heaven on his way to meet the Lord face-to-face in the Tenth (chapter 22). Along the way he encounters vividly described populations of angels who torment wrongdoers; he sees homes, olive oil, and flowers.

See also
Aerial toll houses in Eastern Orthodox theology
Araf (Islam)
Arcs of Descent and Ascent in Neoplatonism
Bardo in Buddhism
Barzakh in Islam
Chinvat Bridge in Zoroastrianism
Dinanukht's heavenly ascension
Gehenna
Limbo in Roman Catholic theology
Masiqta, a Mandaean ritual
Seven Heavens

Apocryphal texts
Coptic Apocalypse of Paul
Ascension of Isaiah
Book of Enoch
2 Enoch
Testament of Abraham
Apocalypse of Abraham

References

Mandaean cosmology
Afterlife places
Mandaic words and phrases